Jung–Seongdong B is a constituency of the National Assembly of South Korea. The constituency consists of Jung District and part of Seongdong District. As of 2016, 172,600 eligible voters were registered in the constituency.

List of members of the National Assembly

Election results

2020

2016

References 

Constituencies of the National Assembly (South Korea)